The Northern Aslian languages (also called Jehaic or Semang) are a group of Aslian languages spoken by about 5,000 people in inland areas of Peninsular Malaysia, with a few pockets in southern Thailand. The most distinctive language in the group is the outlier Cheq Wong, which is spoken south of the Central Aslian language Semai. The other languages apart from Tonga can be split into two divisions:

Cheq Wong
Northern Aslian proper
Eastern
Batek (Batek Deq and Batek Nong), Mintil (Batek Tanɨm)
Jahai (Jehai), Minriq (Menriq)
Jedek
Western
Kintaq
Kensiu (Maniq)

(unclassified) Ten'edn (Mos, Maniq)

The name Maniq (Məniʔ, Maniʔ) can refer to either Kensiu or Tonga, both of which also go by the name of Mos.

Some Aslian languages are already extinct, such as Wila' (also called Bila' or Lowland Semang), a language or various languages recorded having been spoken on the Province Wellesley coast opposite Penang in the early 19th century. Another extinct language is Ple-Temer, which was previously spoken near Gerik in northern Perak (Benjamin 2011).

References

External links 
Benjamin, Geoffrey. 2011. The current situation of the Aslian languages. m.s.
http://projekt.ht.lu.se/rwaai RWAAI (Repository and Workspace for Austroasiatic Intangible Heritage)
http://hdl.handle.net/10050/00-0000-0000-0003-66F8-B@view Northern Aslian languages in RWAAI Digital Archive

Languages of Malaysia
Languages of Thailand